Aaron Robin Hall III (born August 10, 1964) is an American singer and songwriter. Hall rose to prominence in 1988 as a member of the R&B and new jack swing group Guy, which he founded in the late '80s along with Teddy Riley and Timmy Gatling, who was later replaced by Hall's brother Damion Hall. In 1988 Guy released their debut album, which went on to sell over a million copies and was certified platinum. Hall provided lead vocals on songs like "Groove Me," "I Like," and "Piece of My Love." He currently resides in Los Angeles with the occupation as a personal dog trainer.

Early life
Aaron Robin Hall III was born in the Bronx, New York City, and raised in Brooklyn. He is of African-American and Puerto Rican descent. His father Aaron Hall II was a prominent New York pastor. He is the second oldest son of the Hall family, along with prominent brothers as Damion Hall and minister Todd Hall. Hall explored his vocal talent and began singing in a Baptist church from an young age. A few years before Hall segued into his R&B career, his mother Johnella Romeo Hall was hit by a car on Christmas Eve and died.

Hall developed a speech impediment as a child that would last into adulthood, causing him to struggle to pronounce his own name and restricting his ability to give interviews during his early career. Channeling all his energies into his love for dogs, he later became a dog trainer for his celebrity peers.

Career

1987–1992, 1999–2000: Guy
Hall's talent encouraged by his friend, Timmy Gatling, who also worked alongside him in a store, Abraham & Straus in the 1980s. Gatling knew Teddy Riley through their early group called Kids at Work, which was managed by Gene Griffin. After Timmy's discovery, the three decided to form a group, Guy.

In between Hall's traditional gospel voice and erratic singing brought up major comparisons to artists later being in the business. Hall described his own voice as "running on inflections, heavy intonations and very little breathing". His vocal style and ability were influenced on other artists such R. Kelly, Darryl "Dezo" Adams and Joe.

Following the breakup of Guy, Hall signed with Silas Records, a subsidiary label of MCA Records formed by Louil Silas Jr. Hall reunited with his brother and Teddy Riley as Guy for a reunion album, Guy III (2000). It features the modest hit, "Dancin'". The trio is still present on tours in later years.

Solo

The Truth (1993)
Hall began his solo career after his group Guy collapsed. In 1992, he worked with several producers from the Silas label on his debut album, The Truth. It included hits like "Don't Be Afraid", "Get a Little Freaky with Me", "Let's Make Love", and others. One of his biggest singles, "I Miss You", reached #2 on the R&B chart and later peaked at #14 on the Billboard Hot 100, becoming his biggest pop hit. In later years, he created hits for movie soundtracks and collaborated with other artists.

Hall's hits include the #1 R&B single, "Don't Be Afraid". The original and remix of "Don't Be Afraid" was produced by Hank Shocklee from The Bomb Squad; Shocklee produced Public Enemy's music as well.

Inside of You (1998)
Hall released a second studio album in 1998, Inside of You. After the failed Guy reunion in 1997, which only brought a track for the New York Undercover movie soundtrack, Hall announced he would work on another solo album the following year. He names it as a new approach in his career, including a message to harsh conditions he had experienced in the industry. The album features Faith Evans and hip-hop group Terror Squad, and it includes Fat Joe, Big Pun, Cuban Linx and Unique on a remixed track. The album had success with "All The Places (I Will Kiss You)" becoming a hit single, charting as a top 10 hit on Billboard's Top Hip Hop/R&B Songs and a top 30 song on Billboard'''s Hot 100 chart.

Adults Only: The Final Album (2005)
In the late 2000s Hall resigned from MCA starting a new independent label named "Artists Only International". It was a music subsidiary of "Headstart Entertainment". He declared he was "..no longer a slave anymore" referring to his former contract with MCA. Hall experimented with different genres mixing R&B, reggae and hip-hop together, giving his approach to music a more distanced critique from reviewers than usual. He defined it as his "last album" and in an article teased that he would later use a new persona, a new name ("E. Kane"). His visions didn't jibe with his future plans. The album was released in July 2005, following the album release of singer K-Ci releasing ("My Book") on the same label in 2006.

Other works
During the spring of 1994, Hall recorded the song, "Gonna Give it to Ya" with Jewell. It is on Above the Rim's soundtrack which stars Tupac Shakur and Duane Martin.

In the final quarter of 1994, he participated in recording Black Men United with Boyz II Men, Brian McKnight, Tevin Campbell, D'Angelo, R. Kelly, Gerald Levert, and Hall's brother and fellow Guy member Damion Hall in the song "U Will Know" from the Jason's Lyric soundtrack. Hall also recorded the song "Heaven's Girl" with R. Kelly, and Ronald Isley & Charlie Wilson on Quincy Jones' 1995 album Q's Jook Joint.

In 1995, Hall produced a song with Dalvin DeGrate for the Dangerous Minds movie soundtrack named "Curiosity". It was the second most charted song of the album along with "Gangsta's Paradise" by Coolio. The vinyl single includes an exclusive remix by Marley Marl, featuring Redman.

Hall has a son with hip hop model Gloria Velez. He was featured with 2Pac, K-Ci & JoJo and Danny Boy in the 2Pac single "Toss It Up" in his 1996 album The Don Killuminati: The 7 Day Theory''. Hall also recorded a song with Christopher Wallace called "Why You Tryin' To Play Me". It was produced by "X-tra Large" and recorded around1997 before Wallace's death. It was posthumously released on The Projects Presents "Ballhers Forever" compilation by an X-Mix service label.

In 2009, Aaron Hall has presented his ability as a dog trainer in a video titled "Aaron Hall's Dog Rehab" on YouTube.

Discography

Solo albums

Solo singles

References

External links
 

Living people
Musicians from the Bronx
American soul musicians
American tenors
20th-century African-American male singers
American male singers
MCA Records artists
Musicians from New York City
Songwriters from New York (state)
American contemporary R&B singers
1964 births
American musicians of Puerto Rican descent
Hispanic and Latino American musicians
African-American songwriters
21st-century African-American people
American male songwriters
New jack swing musicians